Cathal Brugha Barracks is an Irish Army barracks in Rathmines, Dublin. A key military base of the Irish Defence Forces, it is the headquarters of 2 Brigade, and houses the Military Archives of the Department of Defence.

History
The barracks was originally constructed between 1810 and 1815, and named Portobello Barracks for the area in which it was sited. (When Sir Francis Drake looted the city of Portobelo, Panama, died and was buried at sea in its harbour, many places in England and Ireland were commemoratively named Portobello – including part of Rathmines in 1696. The nearby canal bridge and the area became known as Portobello and thereafter, the barracks.)

In 1817 William Windham Saddler, son of balloonist James Saddler, set off in a hot-air balloon from the grounds of the barracks landing in Holyhead in North Wales.

Originally designed as a cavalry barracks, it saw some development along these lines, with additional land being purchased, and the addition of a church (1842) and canteen block (1868).

During the 1916 Easter Rising, and the Irish War of Independence, British troops from the barracks were involved in actions throughout Dublin. During this time, three journalists, including the pacifist Francis Sheehy-Skeffington, were murdered outside the barrack guardroom. The Royal Irish Rifles company commander Captain Bowen-Colthurst, who ordered the shootings, was controversially adjudged "insane" at the subsequent inquiry and court-martial.

On 17 May 1922 Irish troops took possession of the Barracks, and it became the National Army's Headquarters under General Michael Collins.

In 1952 it was renamed for Cathal Brugha, who was a leader during the 1916 rising, Minister for Defence in the First Dáil, and who lived locally for a time. Cathal Brugha, a leader in the Anti-Treaty IRA, was shot by the National Army on O'Connell street during the Battle of Dublin.

Current use
Since the end of the Irish War of Independence, the barracks has housed units of the Irish Defence Forces, and has more recently been developed as a result of the force's reorganisation. It became the Eastern Command HQ (again) in 1994. Following the 2012 reorganisation of the army, the barracks became headquarters of the reorganised 2 Brigade.

As of 2014, Cathal Brugha Barracks housed the following units:
2 Brigade Headquarters
7 Infantry Battalion
2 Cavalry Squadron
2 Brigade Field CIS Company
2 Brigade Military Police Company
2 Brigade Transport Company
2 Brigade Ordnance Company
2 Brigade Training Centre
2 Brigade Detachment Central Medical Unit 
Army School of Music and No 1 Army Band
(Plus reserves units such as a CIS Radio Platoon and the Dublin Unit of the Naval Service Reserve (DUNSR))

Literary references

See also
 List of Irish military installations

References

Irish Army
Barracks in the Republic of Ireland
Irish military bases
Buildings and structures in Dublin (city)
Military archives